Kotkan Kiri is a Finnish sports club from the city of Kotka.

Club participates in gymnastics, ice hockey and association football. They were originally called Metsolan Kiri, named after Metsola district of Kotka.

Background
They were formed in 1935 after internal political disputes between social democrats and communists had torn Kotkan Riento apart and left Metsola area, in which Riento had had a local section, without a sports club, Riento members from other areas in Kotka had already formed and joined other clubs, like Kotkan Työväen Palloilijat. Idea for a new club came from local shopkeeper Eino Lehtinen, who called locals for a founding meeting. Kiri joined Finnish Workers' Sports Federation after formation. Early sports included boxing, athletics, Nordic skiing, wrestling, football, swimming, and diving, in the past club also organized basketball, table tennis and bandy. Most sports have since been abandoned. In mid 1940s members build a club house which is still in use. In football club played one season in finnish premier league after TUL and SPL leagues were merged for 1948 season. From 1948 to 1955 four different clubs from fairly small Kotka visited finnish first tier, Kiri and Jäntevä represented Metsola district and Hovinsaari in general, while Reipas represented Kristiina district of Kotkansaari, KTP was biggest club in town and drew supporters and players throughout town, in addition Kotkan Palloseura played second tier football throughout 1930s and played third tier football during 1940s and 50s and Kymin Paloillijat played in second tier during late 1950s. Tough competition eventually meant that quality players were hard to find and there was not enough attendance for every club. Most local clubs slowly dropped deeper to lower division in coming decades.

Season to season

1 seasons in Mestaruussarja
1 seasons in Suomensarja
8 seasons in Maakuntasarja
13 seasons in Kolmonen
18 seasons in Nelonen
10 seasons in Vitonen
2 season in Kutonen

Official homepage

References

External links
Finnish Wikipedia
Club profile in Finnish FA official site

Football clubs in Finland
Association football clubs established in 1935
1935 establishments in Finland
Kotka